The Keystone Junior Hockey League (KJHL) is a Junior 'B' ice hockey league in the province of Manitoba, Canada. The league, sanctioned by Hockey Manitoba, was formerly known as the Manitoba Junior 'B' Hockey League.

History 
The KJHL champion used to play the champion of the Northwest Junior Hockey League (NJHL) for the Baldy Northcott Trophy. Since the demise of the NJHL in 2004, the KJHL has been the only Junior 'B' league in the province; thus its champion has been awarded the provincial title. The provincial champion moves on to compete for the Western Canadian Junior 'B' championship, the Keystone Cup.

In 2018, five southern teams of the KJHL announced they were leaving and forming their own league, the Capital Region Junior Hockey League (CRJHL). The five departing clubs Arborg Ice Dawgs, Lundar Falcons, North Winnipeg Satelites, Selkirk Fishermen and St. Malo Warriors cited travel costs as well as parents expressing concerns for bus travel in light of the 2018 Humboldt Broncos bus tragedy. The Fisher River Hawks also announced they would be taking a one-year leave of absence from the league.

The league added another team after their 2019 AGM with the NCN Flames joining for the 2019-20 season. NCN Flames last competed in the Northwest Junior Hockey League in 2004 winning two league championships and one Baldy Northcott Trophy (2002). The league then added a sixth franchise in the PBCN Selects (Peter Ballantyne Cree Nation) at their 2022 AGM, and they will play their first season out of the historic Whitney Forum out of Flin Flon, Manitoba.

Teams

Nisichawayasihk Cree Nation
Opaskwayak Cree Nation
Peter Ballantyne Cree Nation

Former/inactive teams 
Arborg Ice Dawgs (2006–2018) - charter member of the CRJHL
Brandon Stingers (1991–1999)
Carberry Plainsmen (1989–1992)
Central Plains Feathermen (1994–1995)
Ebb & Flow Flyers (1998–2000; 2002–2003)
Fisher River Hawks (2014–2018) - leave of absence in 2018
Gimli Vikings (1978–1998)
Kewatin Canucks (1982–1984)
Lorette Roadrunners (1986–1987)
Lundar Falcons (2010–2018) - charter member of the CRJHL
North East Comets (1980–1983)
Beausejour Comets (1984–1996)
North Lake United (1986–1994)
North Winnipeg Satelites (1980–2018) - charter member of the CRJHL
Oak Bluff Raiders (1986–1990)
Pine Creek Warriors (1999–2000)
Pineview Saints (1981–1982; 1983–1985)
Portage Terriers (1981–1987)
Red River Rockets (1989–1994)
Sagkeeng Braves (1994–1997)
Sagkeeng Hawks (2001–2008; 2010–2011)
Sanford Titans (2008–2010)
Selkirk Fishermen (1977–2018) - charter member of the CRJHL
Souris Elks (1993–1996)
St. Boniface Seals (1998–2005)
Winnipeg Saints (2005–2008)
St. Claude Knights (1981–1984; 1986–1992; 1996–1997; 2000–2003)
St. Malo Warriors (1994–2018) - charter member of the CRJHL
Ste. Anne Aces (1991–1993)
Ste. Rose Royals (1992–1994)
Steinbach Millers (1974–1979; 1981–1983)
Stonewall Jets (1997–2001) - joined MMJHL in 2001
Transcona Railers (1977–1982) - joined MMJHL in 1983
Two Nation River Hawks (2006–2009) - Peguis Juniors and Fisher River Hawks merge

Champions
For a list of provincial champions, please see: Baldy Northcott Trophy.

Notable alumni
Darren Helm (2003–04) – Selkirk Fishermen
Brady Keeper (2012-13) – Norway House North Stars
Thomas Stuart-Dant (2010-13) – Selkirk Fishermen
Neil Wilkinson (1984–85) – Selkirk Fishermen
Bryce Young (2017-18) – OCN Storm

See also
List of ice hockey teams in Manitoba

References

External links
Keystone Junior Hockey League
@KJHLca Twitter
Cross Lake Islanders
Norway House North Stars
OCN Storm
Peguis Juniors

Hockey Manitoba
Ice hockey leagues in Manitoba
B